Comillas Club de Fútbol is a Spanish football team located in Logroño, the capital of the autonomous community of Rioja. Founded in 2006 it currently plays in Tercera División – Group 16, holding home matches at Estadio Mundial 82, with a capacity of 1,275 spectators.

History 
The club was founded in 2006 as a result of the split of AD Loyola. The 2019-20 season is the first in Tercera División for Comillas CF.

Season to season

2 seasons in Tercera División

References 

Association football clubs established in 2006
2006 establishments in Spain
Football clubs in La Rioja (Spain)
Sport in Logroño